The Anhui clique was a military and political organization, one of several mutually hostile cliques or factions that split from the Beiyang clique in the Republic of China's Warlord Era. It was named after Anhui province because several of its generals–including its founder, Duan Qirui–were born in Anhui.

The clique's main members were Duan Qirui, Duan Zhigui, Jin Yunpeng, Wang Yitang, Lu Yongxiang, Zhang Jingyao, Wu Guangxin, Chen Shufan, Zheng Shiqi, Xu Shuzheng, etc.

Because the Anhui clique organized itself very early, it was more politically sophisticated than its warlord rivals.

History
With Japanese support and the suppression of the Manchu Restoration, it became the most powerful faction in China from 1916 to 1920.  They had an uneasy co-existence with the Zhili clique and Fengtian clique in the Beiyang government. They advocated a hardline during the Constitutional Protection War. The May Fourth Movement weakened their influence and eventually led to the Zhili–Anhui War in 1920 which saw the surprise defeat of the Anhui clique. Duan resigned and the clique lacked national leadership for the next four years when all their provinces were eventually annexed by the Zhili clique by the summer of 1924. (Shandong was an anomaly, the Zhili clique appointed an Anhui general in 1923 there provided he remain neutral, see Shandong Problem. Zheng Shiqi ruled until 1925 when he transferred it to Fengtian's Zhang Zongchang per agreement with Duan.)  After the Beijing Coup, Feng Yuxiang and Zhang Zuolin picked Duan to lead a provisional government. Lacking any significant military power, he and his few remaining supporters played Feng and Zhang against each other. They removed him from power and his last followers joined the Fengtian clique.

Political wing
They also had a political wing known as the Anfu Club (literally, Peace and Happiness Club, after a Beijing lane where they met; folk etymology claims it was a pun on Anhui and Fujian) which consisted of politicians that threw their fortune in with Duan. Formed on 7 March 1918 by Xu Shuzheng and Wang Yitang, it ran for elections for the northern National Assembly and won three-fourths of the seats primarily because Anhui warlords bought the votes. They were a highly disciplined party created to push Duan's agenda through legal means such as electing fellow party member Xu Shichang as President of the ROC. Before the Zhili–Anhui War, it was also supported by the Fengtian clique, Xinjiang clique, and Shanxi clique. The Anhui clique was later destroyed after the Zhili-Anhui War when the Assembly was disbanded.

Financial wing
Their financial wing was the New Communications Clique (1916–1919) led by Cao Rulin.  It was the rival to Liang Shiyi's Old Communications Clique. Cao's conduct during the Paris Peace Conference led to the May Fourth Movement and his dismissal.

Notable people

References

See also
Warlord Era
List of Warlords
History of the Republic of China
Huai Army, also known as the Anhui Army

 
1920 disestablishments in China
Warlord cliques in Republican China